Al Ghadir (Arabic: الغدير في الكتاب والسنة والأدب) (that is "The Ghadir in the Book, the Sunnah, and Literature") is a 20-volume book written by the Iranian Shia scholar Abd Al Husayn Amini.

The book describes and discusses the Hadith of the pond of Khumm according to Sunni documents. To do so, Amini has gathered the narrations of 110 companions (Sahaba) as well as 40 followers of Muhammad about the event. He then states the related Hadiths narrated by 360 Hadit narrators between the 2nd to 14th centuries of the Islamic calendar. Since Sunni Muslims - unlike Shia Muslims - do not consider Imam Ali (a.s) as the immediate legitimate successor of Muhammad, Amini in his book has tried to ‌prove Ali's succession based on Sunni documents. Amini, in writing the book, traveled to different countries to take advantage of the libraries there among which were India, Iraq, Pakistan, Morocco, Egypt and some others.

The first print of Al-Ghadir's book was published in Najaf City and developed in 9 volumes. Many scholars of different Islamic countries have written explanation of it.

Translations
Urdu translation of Al-Ghadir has been done by Adeeb-e-asr Allamah Syed Ali Akhtar Rizvi, a Twelver Shī'ah scholar, speaker, author, historian and poet.

Comments on al-Ghadir 
Muhammad Abdul-Ghani Hasan al-Mesri (Arabic: محمد عبد الغني حسن المصري), in his foreword on "al-Ghadir", which has been published in the preface to volume I, second edition, states:

I call on the Almighty to make your limpid brook (in Arabic, 'Ghadir' means brook) the cause of peace and cordiality between the Shia and Sunni brothers to cooperate with one another in building the Islamic ummah.

'Adil Ghadban, the managing editor of the Egyptian magazine entitled "al-Kitab", said the following in the preface to volume 3:

This book clarifies the Shi'ite logic. The Sunnis can correctly learn about the Shi'i through this book. Correct recognition of the Shi'ahs brings the views of the Shi'ahs and the Sunnis closer, and they can make a unified rank.

In this foreword published in the preface to volume 4 of the "Al-Ghadir", Dr. 'Abd al-Rahman al-Kayyali (Arabic: عبدالرحمان كيالي حلبي) says the following after referring to the decline of the Muslims in the present age and the factors which can lead to the Muslims' salvation, one of which is the sound recognition of the successor of Muhammad:

The book entitled "al-Ghadir" and its rich content deserve to be known by every Muslim to learn how historians have been negligent and see where the truth lies. Through this means, we should compensate for the past, and by striving to foster the unity of the Muslims, we should try to gain the due rewards.

References

External links

An online version of Al-Ghadir (in Arabic)

Books about Islam
20th-century Arabic books
Iranian books
Urdu-language books
Shia theology books